"Miss You Like Crazy" is a song by American singer Natalie Cole, released as a single on March 15, 1989, from her 11th solo studio album, Good to Be Back (1989).

Chart performance
"Miss You Like Crazy" was a hit for Cole, becoming her fifth and last top-10 hit on the US Billboard Hot 100 chart when it peaked at number seven. The song topped both the Billboard R&B and Adult Contemporary charts in 1989, as well as reaching number two on the UK Singles Chart, becoming the biggest hit of her career there. In Canada, the song peaked at number 19 for two weeks. "Miss You Like Crazy" is ranked as the 67th-biggest US hit of 1989 and the 20th-biggest UK hit, being certified silver in the latter region.

Critical reception
Jerry Smith from Music Week complimented the song as a "strong, sweeping ballad, where her soaring vocal talents are amply displayed among Michael Masser's dramatic and highly polished production." Colin Irwin from Number One wrote, "'Miss You Like Crazy' is an immaculate pop record — shades of Donna Summer's alliance with S/A/W — and fully deserves its success."

Charts

Weekly charts

Year-end charts

Certifications

Release history

References

External links
 Natalie Cole – Miss You Like Crazy (1989, Vinyl)
 Song review on AllMusic
 

1989 singles
1989 songs
EMI America Records singles
Natalie Cole songs
Songs with lyrics by Gerry Goffin
Songs written by Preston Glass
Songs written by Michael Masser